Victoria Azarenka and Vera Zvonareva were the defending champions. Azarenka chose not to compete and Zvonareva partnered with Lucie Šafářová.
Zvonareva lost in the first round to the wildcard team of Jelena Janković and Tathiana Garbin.
The unseeded pair Květa Peschke and Katarina Srebotnik won in the final 6–4, 2–6, [10–5], against Nadia Petrova and Samantha Stosur.

Seeds

Draw

Finals

Top half

Bottom half

External links
 Main Draw Doubles

2010 WTA Tour
2010 BNP Paribas Open
2010 in American tennis